Microphis ocellatus, the ocellated pipefish, is a species of fish in the family Syngnathidae. It is found only in Indonesia and Sri Lanka. The species measured  SL in length.

References

 http://www.marinespecies.org/aphia.php?p=taxdetails&id=309258
 https://www.itis.gov/servlet/SingleRpt/SingleRpt?search_topic=TSN&search_value=644925

Freshwater fish of Sri Lanka
Freshwater fish of Indonesia
Fish described in 1910
ocellatus